Legia Warszawa, known in English as Legia Warsaw, is a Polish multi-sports club based in Warsaw, Poland. 

Legia was formed between 5 and 15 March 1916 during military operations in World War I on the Eastern Front in the neighborhood of Maniewicze in Volhynia, as the main football club of the Polish Legions. The team had started its first training earlier in the spring of 1915, in the city of Piotrków Trybunalski. In July 1916, due to the Brusilov Offensive, Legia permanently moved to the capital city of Warsaw.

The "Legia" has several teams in many sports, the most famous of which are: the football club and its reserve team; the ice hockey club; the basketball club and the volleyball club.

Other sections include: RC Legia Warszawa rugby union club, futsal, horse riding, gymnastics, judo, athletics, weightlifting, cycling, tennis, wrestling, waterpolo, squash, swimming, fencing, amputee football, badminton and windsurfing. There used to be also a now defunct speedway and table tennis sections.

Zofia Klepacka is part of the windsurfing section of the club. As a 14-year old, Iga Świątek represented the tennis section of the club.

In 2019, the Legia section in amputee football was created.

References 

Legia Warsaw
Multi-sport clubs in Poland
Military sports clubs
Sports clubs established in 1916
1916 establishments in Poland